Peter Kremtz (26 April 1940 – 23 February 2014) was a German rower who competed for East Germany in the 1968 Summer Olympics.

He was born in Meißen. In 1968 he was a crew member of the East German boat which won the silver medal in the coxed four event.

References

External links
 

1940 births
2014 deaths
Olympic rowers of East Germany
Rowers at the 1968 Summer Olympics
Olympic silver medalists for East Germany
Olympic medalists in rowing
East German male rowers
World Rowing Championships medalists for East Germany
Medalists at the 1968 Summer Olympics
People from Meissen
Sportspeople from Saxony